T. J. Duke III (born September 21, 1993) is an American professional stock car racing driver. He has driven in the NASCAR Nationwide Series for Key Motorsports and Go Green Racing, the NASCAR Camping World Truck Series for SS-Green Light Racing and has also raced late models around Florida.

Racing career

NASCAR
Duke started his Truck career at the age of eighteen, driving for SS-Green Light Racing at Martinsville Speedway. With funding from Merrill Lynch, he finished 34th of 36 trucks, 41 laps behind race winner Denny Hamlin. Three weeks later, Duke was hired by Key Motorsports to drive the team's No. 40 car in the penultimate race of the 2011 season at Phoenix. He avoided multiple crashes to finish 23rd, and turned in another top-30 effort the following week at Homestead-Miami Speedway. 

A return to SS-Green Light was in store for 2012, as Duke ran the season-opening NextEra Energy Resources 250 but was swept up in one of the race's many crashes. Although he didn't return to NASCAR that year, he continued racing, competing in the super late model division at Citrus County Speedway.

In 2013, Duke returned for one race at Dover International Speedway with Go Green Racing, finishing 25th.

After NASCAR
Duke has continued to run late models around the southeast, competing around tracks like New Smyrna Speedway

Motorsports career results

NASCAR
(key) (Bold – Pole position awarded by qualifying time. Italics – Pole position earned by points standings or practice time. * – Most laps led.)

Nationwide Series

Camping World Truck Series

 Season still in progress
 Ineligible for series points

References

External links
 
 

Living people
1993 births
People from Southwest Ranches, Florida
Racing drivers from Florida
Racing drivers from Miami
NASCAR drivers
CARS Tour drivers
Sportspeople from Broward County, Florida